Ia Ly is a township of Chư Păh District, Gia Lai Province, Vietnam.

References

Populated places in Gia Lai province
Communes of Gia Lai province
Townships in Vietnam